PEX11G is a human gene that encodes the peroxisomal biogenesis factor 11 gamma for peroxisomes. It is located on chromosome 19.

References

Genes on human chromosome 19